Dihovo (Macedonian Cyrillic: Дихово) is a village in the municipality of Bitola, North Macedonia located under Baba Mountain, about seven kilometers away from Bitola, the second largest city in the country.

Demographics
In the early 19th century population of Dihovo was populated by Tosks, a subgroup of southern Albanians.

In statistics gathered by Vasil Kanchov in 1900, the village of Dihovo was inhabited by 200 Christians and 260 Muslim Albanians. According to the statistics of Geographers Dimitri Mishev and D. M. Brancoff, the town had a total Christian population of 560 in 1905, of which all were Patriarchist Bulgarians. It also had 1 Greek school.

At the outbreak of the Balkan War in 1912, 3 people from Dihovo were volunteers in the Macedonian-Edirne militia. The village remained in Serbia after the Inter-Allied War in 1913.

In 1961 the village had 686 inhabitants.

According to the 2002 census, the village had a total of 310 inhabitants. Ethnic groups in the village include:

Macedonians 305
Serbs 3 
Others 2

Dihovo is a Macedonian village.
In 1951, the families in village were:

 Plosnikovci (24 houses) the oldest family in the village, originally from the village of Ivanjevci

 Skubevci (14 houses) originally from the village of Lera, Bitola

 Toncevci (7 houses) originally from a village near Korce in Albania. They think that their ancestors were orthodox Albanians, but mixed with orthodox Macedonians, and now speak only Macedonian

 Garagadzinja (5 houses) originally from the village of Gneotino

 Karafilovci (5 houses) originally from the village of Oreovo, near Bukovo

 Cvetkovi (3 houses) originally from the village of Drmeni in Prespa

 Prespani (5 houses) originally from the village of Brajcino in Prespa

 Jankulovci (2 houses)

 Janevci (13 houses)

 Gluvcevi (11 houses)

 Temelkovci (6 houses)

 Savini (6 houses)

 Bogojevci (5 houses)

 Vuckovi (5 houses)

 Kotovci (4 houses)

 Damevci (2 houses) all of them with unknown origin. All settled in Dhivovo  in the 19th century.

References

External links

Villages in Bitola Municipality